The Climate Change Performance Index (CCPI) is a scoring system designed by the German environmental and development organisation Germanwatch e.V. to enhance transparency in international climate politics. On the basis of standardised criteria, the index evaluates and compares the climate protection performance of 63 countries and the European Union (EU) (status CCPI 2022), which are together responsible for more than 90% of global greenhouse gas (GHG) emissions.

The CCPI was first published in 2005 and an updated version is presented at the UN Climate Change Conference annually. Germanwatch publishes the index in cooperation with the NewClimate Institute and Climate Action Network International and with financial support from Barthel Foundation. The most important results are available in German, English, French and Spanish.

Methodology 
In 2017, the underlying methodology of the CCPI was revised and adapted to the new climate policy framework of the Paris Agreement from 2015. The CCPI was extended in order to include the measurement of a country’s progress towards the Nationally Determined Contributions (NDCs) and the country’s 2030 targets. The national performances are assessed based on 14 indicators in the following four categories:

1. GHG emissions (weighting 40%)

2. Renewable energy (weighting 20%)

3. Energy use (weighting 20%)

4. Climate policy (weighting 20%)

The three categories "GHG emissions", "renewable energy" and "energy use" are each defined by four equally weighted indicators: (1) current level, (2) recent developments (5-year trend), (3) 2 °C compatibility of the current performance, and (4) 2 °C compatibility of 2030 target. These 12 indicators are complemented by two indicators, measuring the country's performance regarding its national climate policy framework and implementation as well as regarding international climate diplomacy in the category "climate policy". The data for the "climate policy" category is assessed annually in a comprehensive research study. Its basis is the performance rating by climate change experts from non-governmental organisations, universities and think tanks within the countries that are evaluated. In a questionnaire, the respondents give a rating on the most important measures of their governments. The results are rated as very high, high, medium, low, or very low.

Results 
The most recent results illustrate the main regional differences in climate protection efforts and performance within the 57 evaluated countries and the EU. According to the CCPI, none of the countries has yet achieved a performance across all indicators that can be qualified as very high, because no country fulfills the requirements to limit global warming to well below 2 °C, as agreed in the Paris Agreement. This is why the first three places in the final ranking remain unoccupied. In 2023, the CCPI did not evaluate the performance of Ukraine due to the 2022 Russian invasion of Ukraine. In the CCPI index for 2020, Sweden led the ranking, followed by Denmark and Morocco. The last three ranks were taken by the United States, Saudi Arabia and Taiwan.

2023 results

2022 results

2021 results

2020 results

2019 results

External links 
 
The Climate Change Performance Index 2022(english version)
Background and Methodology (English version only)
Climate Change Performance Index 2022: Die wichtigsten Ergebnisse (German version)
Principaux résultats de l'Indice de Performance Climatique (IPC) 2020 (French version)
Los principales resultados del Indice de Desempeño frente al Cambio Climático (IDCC) 2020 (Spanish version)

References 

Climate change organizations
Environmental indices